Francisco Javier Guerrero Martín (born 11 March 1996), commonly known as Francis, is a Spanish professional footballer who plays either as a right back or a right winger.

Club career
Born in Coín, Province of Málaga, Andalusia, Francis joined Real Betis' youth setup in 2014 from Puerto Malagueño CF. He made his senior debut with the B team on 19 April 2015, coming on as a first-half substitute for Nacho Abeledo in a 0–0 Segunda División B away draw against Real Balompédica Linense.

Francis scored his first senior goal on 21 February 2016, his team's only in a 1–3 loss at Real Jaén. On 15 March of the following year, he renewed his contract with the club.

Francis made his first-team – and La Liga – debut on 20 August 2017, replacing Matías Nahuel in a 0–2 away defeat against FC Barcelona. Converted to a right back by manager Quique Setién, he scored his first professional goal the following 17 March by netting the last in a 3–0 home win over RCD Espanyol.

On 31 January 2020, having only featured in one Copa del Rey match during the season, Francis was loaned to Segunda División side UD Almería until June. In October, he was released by Betis.

Club statistics

References

External links

Beticopedia profile 

1996 births
Living people
Sportspeople from the Province of Málaga
Spanish footballers
Footballers from Andalusia
Association football defenders
Association football wingers
La Liga players
Segunda División players
Segunda División B players
Tercera División players
Betis Deportivo Balompié footballers
Real Betis players
UD Almería players
Spain under-21 international footballers